Bishop Johannes Rudbeckius or Johannes Rudbeck (April 3, 1581–August 8, 1646), was bishop at Västerås, Sweden from 1619 until his death and personal chaplain to King Gustavus II Adolphus.

Biography
Johannes Rudbeck was born in Ormesta, Almby parish, outside Örebro, Sweden. He was the son of Johan Pedersson Rudbeck (1550-1603) and Christina Pedersdtr Bose. He was a student at Uppsala University in 1598 and at University of Wittenberg received his Master of Philosophy in 1693. He was a professor of mathematics at Uppsala from 1604, professor of Hebrew from 1609 and professor of theology from 1611.

He was made Bishop in the Diocese of Västerås in 1618. In his capacity of bishop, he was restlessly active in organising. He founded the Swedish system of parish registers, ordering his parsons to file comments on every person in the parish. In 1623 he founded the first gymnasium, a school of secondary education in Sweden. He also founded the first school for girls in Sweden, Rudbeckii flickskola, in 1632. Rudbeckius was considered politically suspect by his superiors but his reforms were gradually introduced in the whole country.

Personal life
With his second wife Magadalena Malin Carlsdotter (1602–1649), he had a son Olaus Rudbeck (1630–1702), who was a noted scientist of the 17th century. His grandson Olof Rudbeck the Younger (1660–1740) was a scientist, botanist and ornithologist. Bishop Rudbeckius' granddaughter, Wendela Rudbeck (1668–1710), married Peter Olai Nobelius (1655–1707) from whom descended Alfred Nobel (1833–1896).

References 

1581 births
1646 deaths
People from Örebro
Uppsala University alumni
University of Wittenberg alumni
Academic staff of Uppsala University
Rectors of Uppsala University
17th-century Swedish Lutheran priests
Bishops of Västerås
17th-century Swedish educators